The 2006 Sun Belt Conference football season was an NCAA football season that was played from August 28, 2008, to January 6, 2009. The Sun Belt Conference consisted of 8 football members:  Arkansas State, Florida Atlantic, Florida International, Louisiana-Lafayette, Louisiana-Monroe, Middle Tennessee, North Texas, and Troy. Troy and MTSU split the Sun Belt Championship, with Troy playing in the New Orleans Bowl where they defeated Rice. Middle Tennessee would play in the Motor City Bowl where they lost to Central Michigan.

References